Sitka Fine Arts Camp is a nationally-recognized fine arts summer camp located in Sitka, Alaska. The camp was established in 1973 at Sheldon Jackson College. It used other locations in the years that followed before acquiring the majority of historic Sheldon Jackson College buildings and campus in 2011. It took almost four years for a USDA Rural Development loan to be transferred from the college to the camp because of a "maze of paperwork," but it was done in 2013.

The college was established in 1878 and was the oldest institution of higher learning in Alaska. The camp enrolled approximately 700 in 2013 and offerings have expanded to include a circus program. Adult programs such as a Native Jazz Workshop and the Sitka Arts and Science Institute are also offered and have included artists such as Jason Marsalis.

History
Founded in 1973, Sitka Fine Arts Camp is a multi-disciplinary arts camp featuring the dramatic arts, music, literary arts, visual arts (ceramics, painting, drawing, sculpture, mask making, photography, video production, Alaska Native arts), and dance. The camp features four separate sessions: "mini camp" (fifth grade and below), middle school camp, high school camp, and a musical theatre camp for high school and college students. Each session culminates in final performances and visual art exhibits. The camp was founded at the Sheldon Jackson College campus, moved to the University of Alaska Southeast/Mt. Edgecumbe High School campus in the 1980s, switched back to Sheldon Jackson College in the 1990s, returned to the Mt. Edgecumbe High School campus in 2006, and in 2011, after the bankruptcy of Sheldon Jackson College and the transfer of its campus to the Fine Arts Camp's parent organization, Alaska Arts Southeast, Inc., the camp returned to the SJ campus.  In 2013 the United States Department of Agriculture approved the transfer of two USDA-funded buildings on the campus to Alaska Arts Southeast, and the campus is undergoing continuing renovation activities.

Recognition
In 2004, was selected by the National Endowment for the Arts as one of ten exceptional summer arts programs in the country.
In 2004, camp executive director Roger Schmidt was awarded the 2004 Alaska Governor's Award for Arts Education.
In 2005, was selected by the National Endowment for the Arts as one of 25 exceptional summer arts programs in the country.
In 2007 received the Coming Up Taller Award from the President's Committee on Arts and Humanities at a ceremony with First Lady, Laura Bush at the White House.

Notable faculty
Alon Yavnai
Kristin Korb
Marco d'Ambrosio, noted composer.
Brian Neal, member of Dallas Brass.
Amy Butcher

External links
Sitka Fine Arts Camp

References

Education in Sitka, Alaska
Educational institutions established in 1973
Summer schools
Summer camps in Alaska
Buildings and structures in Sitka, Alaska
1973 establishments in Alaska